Bayonne station (French: Gare de Bayonne) is a railway station in Bayonne, Nouvelle-Aquitaine, France. The station is located on the Bordeaux - Irun, Toulouse–Bayonne and Bayonne–Saint-Jean-Pied-de-Port railway lines. The station is served by TGV (high speed trains), Intercités de Nuit (night trains), Intercités (long distance) and TER (local) services operated by the SNCF.

Train services
The following services currently call at Bayonne:
high speed services (TGV) Paris - Bordeaux - Hendaye
intercity services (Intercités) Hendaye - Bayonne - Pau - Tarbes - Toulouse
local service (TER Nouvelle-Aquitaine) Bordeaux - Dax - Bayonne - Hendaye
local service (TER Nouvelle-Aquitaine) Bayonne - Pau - Tarbes
local service (TER Nouvelle-Aquitaine) Bayonne - Saint-Jean-Pied-de-Port

Gallery

References

Railway stations in Pyrénées-Atlantiques
Bayonne